The men's 100 metre backstroke event at the 2015 European Games in Baku took place on 26 June at the Aquatic Palace.

Results

Heats
The heats were started at 09:41.

Semifinals
The semifinals were started at 17:36.

Semifinal 1

Semifinal 2

Final
The final was held at 19:33.

References

Men's 50 metre backstroke